Atlético Clipper Clube, commonly known as Clipper, is a Brazilian football club based in Manaus, Amazonas.

History
The club was founded on June 1, 1952.  They finished in the second position in the Campeonato Amazonense in 1996 and in 2002.

Stadium
Atlético Clipper Clube play their home games at Estádio Roberto Simonsen, commonly known as SESI. The stadium has a maximum capacity of 5,000 people. Until July 2010, the club played their home games at Vivaldão. Vivaldão had a maximum capacity of 31,000 people.

References

Football clubs in Amazonas (Brazilian state)
Association football clubs established in 1952
1952 establishments in Brazil